The Florida Classic was a golf tournament on the Buy.com Tour from 1999 to 2001. It was played at the Gainesville Country Club in Gainesville, Florida.

The purse in 2001 was US$425,000, with $76,500 going to the winner.

Winners

References

Former Korn Ferry Tour events
Golf in Florida
Recurring sporting events established in 1999
Recurring sporting events disestablished in 2001